Pier-Francesco Sacchi (known active 1512–1520) was an Italian painter of the Renaissance period.

Born in Pavia, he worked in Genoa and became a member of that guild of painters in 1520. He painted in 1512, the Parting of St. John Baptist from his parents for the Oratory of Santa Maria in Genoa. He followed a style of Carlo Mantegna.

References

External links

Artists from Pavia
16th-century Italian painters
Italian male painters
Painters from Genoa
Italian Renaissance painters
Year of birth unknown
Year of death unknown